The city of Novgorod was a major trade hub from the beginning of its history as part of Kievan Rus' through the years of the Novgorod Republic in the 12th–15th centuries. Novgorod benefitted from its location at the crossroads of several major trading routes, including the route from Scandinavia to the Byzantine Empire and the Volga route connecting Rus' to the Middle East. Novgorod had trade contact with inhabitants of the Baltic seaboard and was described as a "trade city" by Scandinavian merchants. Trade was eventually dominated by German cities united in the Hanseatic League, which had its easternmost office in Novgorod. Despite the thriving trade, Novgorod had numerous conflicts with the League.

The main exports of Novgorod were furs, honey, wax, leather and fish, while silver, cloth, wine, salt and herring were imported. Trade involved Novgorodians of different social status, including professional merchants, landowners, peasants and moneylenders. The center of trade in Novgorod was the Torg (marketplace), located across the Volkhov from the Kremlin.

Trade with Western Europe

Novgorodian trade contact with inhabitants of the Baltic seaboard took place from the earliest times and grew in importance over time. The Scandinavian sagas describe Novgorod (Holmgardr) as a "trade city" which was visited by Scandinavian merchants who bought furs and luxury cloth. The similarity of objects found in hoards in Novgorod and Southern Baltic attests to contact between the regions.

Contact with Gotland was established in the 10th century and became stronger by the 12th century when merchants from Gotland founded a trading house known as the Gothic Yard in Novgorod with the church of St Olaf. At that time Novgorodians sailed the Baltic themselves (several incidents involving Novgorodian merchants in Gotland and Denmark are reported in the Novgorodian First Chronicle) and had a trade post on Gotland of which only the ruins of an Orthodox church remain.

Gradually trade in the Baltic became dominated by the German cities which eventually were united into the Hanseatic League. The League monopolised the Baltic trade and had its easternmost kontor (trading post) in Novgorod. Over time a pattern emerged, with two groups of merchants departing for Novgorod from Livonian cities twice a year, in summer and winter. They travelled both by sea and by land. The sea route went from Reval to Kotlin Island, where goods were reloaded to Russian river boats, then by the Neva, Lake Ladoga and the Volkhov. The importance of the land route grew during conflicts between Novgorod and Sweden in the late 13th and early 14th centuries.

In spite of the thriving trade, Novgorod had numerous conflicts with the League which were usually caused by disagreement on terms of exchange, violations of the rules of trade and attacks on merchants. A trade war from 1385–1391 was concluded by 's peace treaty which set the terms of trade. The treaty gave merchants the right of free passage and established the principle of individual responsibility for infractions, in contrast to the previous practice of collective responsibility.

The treaty became the basis for the relationship between Novgorod and German cities for the next hundred years but did not prevent numerous conflicts in the 15th century. The main points of contention  were the right of Novgorodian merchants to carry out sea trade independently and the terms of exchange. German merchants had the right to inspect furs and wax (by chipping off pieces which were not included in the final weight) whereas Russian merchants had to buy batches of cloth, barrels of herring and wine and sacks of salt without examining or weighing them.  At the same time, trade with non-Hanseatic cities such as Narva, Vyborg and Stockholm grew in importance.

Commodities

Fur dominated the exports of Novgorod to Western Europe, where it was used for fashionable clothing for the elites. Squirrel formed the bulk of the exports, with the rest consisting of more valuable sable, mink and marten. The furs came from the vast lands to the north and east of Novgorod, where according to medieval accounts the furs were so abundant that squirrels were raining from the sky. Novgorod also exported honey, wax, leather and fish.

Silver, cloth, wine, salt and herring were imported from Western Europe. Novgorod also imported silver and other metals such as copper, tin and lead. Since they were needed for armaments, Sweden and the Livonian order tried to stop this trade during their conflicts with Novgorod.

Eastern trade

The route from the Varangians to the Greeks went south via Kiev, where Novgorodian merchants had a court in Podil. Silk, glass, wine, oil and glassware were imported from Byzantium via this route. The trade came to an end after the sack of Kiev by the Mongols in 1240.

The Volga route was important in the 9th and 10th centuries when large quantities of silver were imported via Bolghar and Novgorod into Northern Europe. The trade continued even after the Mongol invasion; however, this direction was no longer of primary importance for Novgorod.

Grain from other Russian territories was vital to Novgorod as it was not reliably self-sufficient. Grain was also transported via the Volga and its tributaries, with the town of Torzhok controlling the trade.

Merchants, taxes and regulation

Analysis of birch bark documents has shown that the trade involved Novgorodians from almost all social strata: professional merchants, landowners, peasants and moneylenders.

The merchants carrying out the trade with Western Europe and other Russian cities were called gosti. Some of them formed associations, of which the most famous were the associations of wax merchants known as Ivan's Hundred and the associations of the overseas merchants.

Novgorod Torg, on the other side of the Volkhov from the Kremlin, was the centre of trade in the city. The quays, trade rows, merchants' churches and foreign merchants' courts were all located there. Objects belonging to German merchants, including a birch-bark document with an inscription in Latin, have been found during excavations of the Gothic Yard. Disputes between merchants were under the jurisdiction of the merchant court which included the tysyatsky and two representatives of the merchants. It sat near the church of St John the Forerunner in the Torg, where the weight and length standards were kept as well.

Trade dues were initially collected by the princes but in the 13th century the merchants' corporations got this right. The rules of trade were codified in agreements between Novgorod its princes Vsevolod and Yaroslav. The agreements set the level of dues Novgorodian merchants paid in lands belonging to the prince and prohibited establishing customs houses and interfering in international trade. These terms served as a precedent and were renewed in all subsequent agreements between Novgorod and its princes until the end of the republic.

References

Bibliography

Novgorod Republic
History of international trade